Paradise Bay is an American serial which aired on NBC Daytime from September 27, 1965, to July 1, 1966. The show was created by Ted Corday who later created the serial Days of Our Lives.

The show aired in the morning at 11:30 a.m.; it was paired with Morning Star which aired before it and also was created by Corday. Paradise Bay and Morning Star premiered on the same day, and were cancelled on the same day.

Paradise Bay was one of the first soap operas to air in color.  Among the writers was Irving Vendig who had written Search for Tomorrow, Three Steps to Heaven, The Edge of Night, and The Clear Horizon.

Cast
The following actors were among those who appeared on the program.

 Marion Ross as Mary Morgan
 Heather North as Kitty Morgan
 Keith Andes as Jeff Morgan
 K. T. Stevens as Estelle Kimball
 Walter Brooke as Walter Montgomery

Ratings
see List of American daytime soap opera ratings

1965-1966 Season
1. As the World Turns 13.9
2. The Guiding Light 11.2
3. Search For Tomorrow 11.0
4. The Secret Storm 10.9
13. Paradise Bay  4.1 (Debut)

Storylines
The main storyline during the series' run was a murder. The body of a murdered girl washed up on shore during the first episode. Other storylines included the goings on at a local radio station, run by Jeff Morgan (Keith Andes), who was married to Mary Morgan (Marion Ross). Their daughter, Kitty, was played by Heather North, and the story of a local band run by the teens. Paradise Bay used contemporary music, and was one of the first soap operas to do so.

Marion Ross (Mary Morgan) would later become best known for her long-running role of Marion Cunningham on the long-running situation comedy, Happy Days.

References

External links 
 

American television soap operas
NBC original programming
1965 American television series debuts
1966 American television series endings
English-language television shows
Television series by Sony Pictures Television